This is a list of premiers of Quebec in order of time served in office as premier of Quebec as of . The current premier always stays in office during an election campaign, and that time is included in the total.

Other information

Quebec

Premiers